The buff-breasted tody-tyrant (Hemitriccus mirandae) is a species of bird in the family Tyrannidae. It is endemic to Brazil. Its natural habitats are subtropical or tropical dry forests and subtropical or tropical moist lowland forests. It is threatened by habitat loss.

References

External links
BirdLife Species Factsheet.

buff-breasted tody-tyrant
Birds of Brazil
Endemic birds of Brazil
buff-breasted tody-tyrant
buff-breasted tody-tyrant
Taxonomy articles created by Polbot